The 2014 Rhode Island gubernatorial election took place on November 4, 2014, to elect the Governor of Rhode Island, concurrently with the election of Rhode Island's Class II U.S. Senate seat, as well as other elections to the United States Senate in other states and elections to the United States House of Representatives and various state and local elections.

Incumbent Democratic Governor Lincoln Chafee was eligible to run for re-election to a second term but decided to retire. In primary elections held on September 9, 2014, the Democrats nominated Rhode Island Treasurer Gina Raimondo and the Republicans nominated Cranston Mayor Allan Fung. Also on the ballot were Robert J. Healey of the Moderate Party and two Independent candidates. Raimondo won the election, becoming the first Democrat to be elected governor since Bruce Sundlun in 1992 (Chafee had been elected as an Independent in 2010, switching to the Democratic Party during his term). Raimondo became the first female Governor in Rhode Island history.

Background
In the 2010 gubernatorial election, Republican incumbent Donald Carcieri was term-limited and unable to seek a third term in office. The Republicans nominated businessman John Robitaille and the Democrats nominated State Treasurer Frank T. Caprio. Also contesting the election were Moderate Party nominee Ken Block and Lincoln Chafee, who served as a Republican U.S. Senator from 1999 to 2007. After losing a bid for re-election in 2006, Chafee left the Republican Party and became an Independent, running for governor as such. After a close three-way race between Chafee, Robitaille and Caprio, Chafee won the election with a plurality, taking 36% to Robitaille's 34%, Caprio's 23% and Block's 6%.

After constant speculation during his term, Chafee officially joined the Democratic Party on May 30, 2013. He had previously indicated that he might run for re-election as an Independent or a Democrat. In the face of low approval ratings, polling showing him trailing in both the Democratic primary and the general election, and with weak fundraising, Chafee announced on September 4, 2013 that he would not run for re-election. Chafee thus became just the fourth Governor in the history of Rhode Island to decline to seek a second term, after Byron Diman in 1847, Royal C. Taft in 1889 and William S. Flynn in 1924.

Democratic primary
Gina Raimondo and Angel Taveras announced their campaigns in late 2013 and the race initially seemed to be between the more fiscally moderate Raimondo and the more progressive Taveras. However, the entry of Clay Pell into the race complicated things. Unions who had criticised Raimondo for cutting pension benefits and investing in hedge funds during her tenure as Treasurer and for fundraising from Wall Street and national lobbyists were split between whether to back Taveras or Pell. A coalition of unions including firefighters, police, supermarket clerks and city employees backed Taveras, whereas the powerful teachers' unions backed Pell, unimpressed with Taveras' support for charter schools. Raimondo drew support from non-union and private sector workers and some private sector unions including iron workers. Pell spent over $3.4 million of his own money and ran a positive campaign, but he was much criticised for his inexperience and lack of ties to Rhode Island. Taveras emphasised his background as the son of poor Dominican immigrants to appeal to Latino and working-class voters. All three candidates agreed not to seek the endorsement of the state Democratic Party. Ultimately, Taveras and Pell took an almost equal share of the vote as progressive Democrats split their vote between the two, allowing Raimondo to win with a plurality. Raimondo won 36 of the state's 39 municipalities. Taveras won Central Falls and Pell won Burrillville and Foster.

Candidates

Declared
 Todd Giroux, contractor and independent candidate for governor in 2010
 Clay Pell, former Deputy Assistant Secretary for International and Foreign Language Education in the United States Department of Education and grandson of Rhode Island’s longest serving senator Claiborne Pell
 Gina Raimondo, Treasurer of Rhode Island
 Angel Taveras, Mayor of Providence

Withdrew
 Ernie Almonte, former Auditor General of Rhode Island (running for Treasurer of Rhode Island)
 Lincoln Chafee, incumbent Governor

Declined
 Patrick C. Lynch, former Attorney General of Rhode Island
 Elizabeth H. Roberts, Lieutenant Governor of Rhode Island
 Robert Weygand, former U.S. Representative

Polling

 ^ Internal poll for the Angel Taveras Campaign

Results

Republican primary

Candidates

Declared
 Ken Block, Moderate Party nominee for governor in 2010
 Allan Fung, Mayor of Cranston

Declined
 Scott Avedisian, Mayor of Warwick
 Brendan Doherty, former Superintendent of the Rhode Island State Police and nominee for Rhode Island's 1st congressional district in 2012
 Barry Hinckley, businessman and nominee for the U.S. Senate in 2012
 John Robitaille, former aide to Governor Donald Carcieri and nominee for Governor in 2010

Polling

 * Internal poll for the Ken Block campaign

Results

Other parties

Candidates

Declared
 Robert J. Healey (Moderate), perennial candidate
 Kate Fletcher (Independent)
 Leon Kayarian (Independent)

Withdrew
 Ken Block (Moderate), nominee for Governor in 2010 (switched to Republican primary)
 James Spooner (Moderate)

Removed from ballot
 Thomas Davis (Independent)
 Christopher Reynolds (Independent)
 Anna Winograd Vrankar (Compassion)

Declined
 Gina Raimondo (Independent), Democratic Treasurer of Rhode Island (won the Democratic primary)

General election

Campaign
Union voter dissatisfaction with Raimondo carried over into the general election, with one poll finding they backed Republican Allan Fung over her, 42% to 30%. Moderate Party nominee Robert J. Healey won 22% of the vote, having spent $35.31 to receive 67,707 votes, or $0.0005 (five ten-thousandths of a dollar) for each vote he received. He later joked, "It's amazing what $35 can do. As I've been saying, if we only spent $75, $80, we might've won the race."

Debates
Complete video of debate, October 21, 2014

Predictions

Polling

 * Internal poll for the Allan Fung campaign

With Raimondo

With Taveras

With Chafee

Four-way race

Results

By county

By municipality

References

External links
Rhode Island gubernatorial election, 2014 at Ballotpedia

Official campaign websites (Archived)
Robert J. Healey for Governor
Ken Block for Governor
Allan Fung for Governor
Todd Giroux for Governor
Bob Healey for Governor
Clay Pell for Governor
Gina Raimondo for Governor
Angel Taveras for Governor
Kate Fletcher for Governor 2014

2014 Rhode Island elections
2014
2014 United States gubernatorial elections